Joshua Tree National Park is an American national park in southeastern California, east of San Bernardino and Los Angeles and north of Palm Springs. It is named after the Joshua trees (Yucca brevifolia) native to the Mojave Desert. Originally declared a national monument in 1936, Joshua Tree was redesignated as a national park in 1994 when the U.S. Congress passed the California Desert Protection Act. Encompassing a total of  – slightly larger than the state of Rhode Island – the park includes  of designated wilderness. Straddling San Bernardino and Riverside Counties, the park includes parts of two deserts, each an ecosystem whose characteristics are determined primarily by elevation: the higher Mojave Desert and the lower Colorado Desert. The Little San Bernardino Mountains traverse the southwest edge of the park.

History

Early
The earliest known residents of the land in and around what later became Joshua Tree National Park were the people of the Pinto Culture, who lived and hunted here between 8000 and 4000 BCE. Their stone tools and spear points, discovered in the Pinto Basin in the 1930s, suggest that they hunted game and gathered seasonal plants, but little else is known about them. Later residents included the Serrano, the Cahuilla, and the Chemehuevi peoples. All three lived at times in small villages in or near water, particularly the Oasis of Mara in what non-aboriginals later called Twentynine Palms. They subsisted largely on plant foods supplemented by small game, amphibians, and reptiles while using other plants for making medicines, bows, arrows, baskets, and other articles of daily life.

A fourth group, the Mojaves, used the local resources as they traveled along trails between the Colorado River and the Pacific coast. In the 21st century, small numbers of all four peoples live in the region near the park; the Twentynine Palms Band of Mission Indians, descendants of the Chemehuevi, own a reservation in Twentynine Palms.

In 1772, a group of Spaniards led by Pedro Fages made the first European sightings of Joshua trees while pursuing native converts to Christianity who had run away from a mission in San Diego. By 1823, the year Mexico achieved independence from Spain, a Mexican expedition from Los Angeles, in what was then Alta California, is thought to have explored as far east as the Eagle Mountains in what later became the park. Three years later, Jedediah Smith led a group of American fur trappers and explorers along the nearby Mojave Trail, and others soon followed. Two decades after that, the United States defeated Mexico in the Mexican–American War (1846–48) and took over about half of Mexico's original territory, including California and the future parkland.

Post-1870
In 1870, white settlers began grazing cattle on the tall grasses that grew in the park. In 1888, a gang of cattle rustlers moved into the region near the Oasis of Mara. Led by brothers  James B. and William S. McHaney, they hid stolen cattle in a box canyon at Cow Camp. Throughout the region, ranchers dug wells and built rainwater catchments called "tanks", such as White Tank and Barker Dam.

In 1900, C. O. Barker, a miner and cattleman, built the original Barker Dam, later improved by William "Bill" Keys, a rancher. Grazing continued in the park through 1945. Barker Dam was added to the National Register of Historic Places (NRHP) in 1975.

Between the 1860s and the 1940s, miners worked about 300 pit mines, mostly small, in what later became the park. The most successful, the Lost Horse Mine, produced gold and silver worth about $5 million in today's currency. Johnny Lang and others, the original owners of the Lost Horse Mine, installed a two-stamp mill to process ore at the site, and the next owner, J.D. Ryan, replaced it with a 10-stamp steam-powered mill. Ryan pumped water from his ranch to the mill and cut timber from the nearby hills to heat water to make steam. Most of the structures associated with the mine fell apart, and for safety reasons the National Park Service plugged the mine, which had collapsed.

The Desert Queen Mine on Keys' Desert Queen Ranch was another productive gold mine. In the early 1930s, Keys bought a gasoline-powered two-stamp mill, the Wall Street Mill, and moved it to his ranch to process ore. The ranch and mill were added to the NRHP in 1975 and the mine in 1976. Some of the mines in the park yielded copper, zinc, and iron.

Protection
The monument was redesignated as a national park on October 31, 1994, by the Desert Protection Act, which also added . In 2019, the park expanded by  under a provision included in the John D. Dingell, Jr. Conservation, Management, and Recreation Act.

The Mojave Desert Land Trust (MDLT) has conserved  within the park. These inholdings were private ownership within the national park that they were able to purchase. They also acquire private properties bordering federally protected properties. MDLT has sold  of acquired private property to the national park service which is more than any other similar organization.

Geography

Potential natural vegetation
According to the A. W. Kuchler U.S. Potential natural vegetation types, Joshua Tree National Park has two categories, a creosote bush potential vegetation type with a desert shrubland potential vegetation form in most of the area, and a juniper/pinyon pine potential vegetation type with a Great Basin montane forest/southwest forest potential vegetation form on the higher elevations of the western side of the park.

Mojave Desert

The higher and cooler Mojave Desert is the special habitat of Yucca brevifolia, the Joshua tree for which the park is named. It occurs in patterns from dense forests to distantly spaced specimens. In addition to Joshua tree forests, the western part of the park includes some of the most interesting geologic displays found in California's deserts. The dominant geologic features of this landscape are hills of bare rock, usually broken up into loose boulders. These hills are popular among rock climbing and scrambling enthusiasts. The flatland between these hills is sparsely forested with Joshua trees. Together with the boulder piles and Skull Rock, the trees make the landscape otherworldly. Snows occur occasionally at higher elevations. Summers are hot, over  during the day and not cooling much below  until the early hours of the morning.

Joshua trees dominate the open spaces of the park, but in among the rock outcroppings are piñon pine, California juniper (Juniperus californica), Quercus turbinella (desert scrub oak), Quercus john-tuckeri (Tucker's oak), Quercus cornelius-mulleri (Muller's oak), Cylindropuntia chuckwallensis (chuckwalla cholla), and Opuntia chlorotica (dollarjoint pricklypear).

These communities are under some stress, however, as the climate was wetter until the 1930s, with the same hot and dry conditions that provoked the Dust Bowl affecting the local climate. These cycles were nothing new, but the original vegetation did not prosper when wetter cycles returned. The difference may have been human development. Cattle grazing took out some of the natural covers and made it less resistant to the changes.

There are fewer Joshua tree seedlings surviving in the park. It is forecasted that by 2099, under the high emission scenario, the park will increase in temperature by 8 °F. This would make most of the national park unsuitable for Joshua tree growth. Under the low emission scenario, 80% of suitable Joshua tree habitat could be lost.

The desert tortoise population has decreased due to habitat loss and climate change. Lizards in the park are also at risk. Bird species have declined 43% according to studies conducted in 1908–1968 and 2013–2016.

Colorado Desert 

Below , the Colorado Desert encompasses the eastern part of the park and features habitats of creosote bush scrub, ocotillo, desert saltbush, and mixed scrub including yucca and cholla cactus (Cylindropuntia bigelovii). Some areas of such cactus are dense enough to appear as natural gardens. The lower Coachella Valley is on the southeastern side of the park with sandy soil grasslands and desert dunes.

The only palm native to California, the California fan palm (Washingtonia filifera), occurs naturally in five oases in the park, rare areas where water occurs naturally year-round, and all forms of wildlife abound.

Invasive species
Invasive plants such as cheat grass and red brome contribute to the worsening of wildfires. During wetter periods fills in below and among the pines and oak. In drier times, they die back but do not quickly decompose. This makes wildfires hotter and more destructive, which kills some of the trees that would have otherwise survived. When the area regenerates, these non-native grasses form a thick layer of turf that makes getting a roothold harder for the pine and oak seedlings.

Fountain grass was introduced to the park in the 1990s. This grass competes with native grasses for water and nutrients.

Climate
According to the Köppen climate classification system, Joshua Tree National Park has a hot desert climate (BWh).

Joshua Tree is becoming hotter and drier due to climate change. From 1895 to 2016 the annual precipitation has dropped by 39% and the annual temperature has increased by 3 °F. Because of the hotter and drier conditions, there are more wildfires in the park.

Geology

The park's oldest rocks, Pinto Gneiss among them, are 1.7 billion years old. They are exposed in places on the park's surface in the Cottonwood, Pinto, and Eagle Mountains. Much later, from 250 to 75 million years ago, tectonic plate movements forced volcanic material toward the surface at this location and formed granites, including monzogranite common to the Wonderland of Rocks, parts of the Pinto, Eagle, and Coxcomb Mountains, and elsewhere. Erosion eventually exposed the harder rocks, gneiss, and granite, in the uplands and reduced the softer rocks to debris that filled the canyons and basins between the ranges. The debris, moved by gravity and water, formed alluvial fans at the mouths of canyons, and bajadas, where the alluvial fans overlapped.

The rock formations of Joshua Tree National Park owe their shape partly to groundwater, which filtered through the roughly rectangular joints of the monzonite and eroded the corners and edges of blocks of stone, and to flash floods, which washed away covering ground and left piles of rounded boulders. These prominent outcrops are known as inselbergs.

Of the park's six blocks of mountains, five—the Little San Bernardino, Hexie, Pinto, Cottonwood, and Eagle—are among the Transverse Ranges, which trend generally east–west in locations between the Eagle Mountains on the east and the northern Channel Islands, in the Pacific Ocean west of Santa Barbara, on the west. Tectonic forces along the San Andreas Fault system compressed and lifted the crust material that formed these ranges. The San Andreas Fault itself passes southwest of the park, but related parallel faults, including the Dillon, Blue Cut, and Pinto, run through the park, and movements along them have caused earthquakes. The easternmost range in the park, the Coxcomb Mountains, runs generally north–south and is part of the Basin and Range Province.

Recreation

Camping

Nine established campgrounds exist in the park, two of which (Black Rock Campground and Cottonwood Campground) provide water and flush toilets. A fee is charged per night for each camping spot. Reservations are accepted at Black Rock Campground, Cottonwood Campground, Indian Cove Campground, and Jumbo Rocks Campground for October through May, while the other campgrounds are first-come, first-served. Backcountry camping, for those who wish to backpack, is permitted with a few regulations.

Hiking

Several hiking trails are within the park, many of which can be accessed from a campground. Shorter trails, such as the one-mile hike through Hidden Valley, offer a chance to view the beauty of the park without straying too far into the desert. A section of the California Riding and Hiking Trail meanders for  through the western side of the park. The lookout point at Keys View, towards the south of the park, offers views of the Coachella Valley, the Salton Sea, the San Andreas Fault, the Santa Rosa Mountains, and the city of Palm Springs.

Nature walks inside the park include:
 Hidden Valley
 Indian Cove
 Cholla Cactus Garden

Longer trails include:
 Boy Scout Hiking and Equestrian Trail
 Contact Mine
 Fortynine Palms Oasis
 Lost Horse Mine
 Lost Palms Oasis
 Ryan Mountain
 Warren Peak
 California Riding and Hiking Trail

Due to graffiti on at least 17 sites on trails, officials have closed them to the public. The closed sites include Native American sites, Rattlesnake Canyon, and Barker Dam. They blame the increase in vandalism on the increased use of social media.

Climbing

The park is popular with rock climbers and was originally a winter practice area while Yosemite Valley and other parts of the Sierra Nevada were snowbound, but later became an area of interest in its own right. Its thousands of named climbing routes contain all levels of difficulty. The rocks are all composed of quartz monzonite, a very rough type of granite, made even more so as no snow or ice polishes it as in places such as Yosemite.

Some routes are permanently closed, while others are closed temporarily to protect sensitive wildlife in certain seasons. Climbing and bouldering routes that are permanently closed include Energy Crisis, the Schwarzenegger Wall, Zombie Woof Rock, the Maverick Boulder formation, Pictograph Boulder, Shindig, Lonely Stones Area #3, and the Shipwreck formation, Indian Wave Boulders (except for Native Arete), and Wormholes. , seasonal closures include the Slatanic Area, Towers of Uncertainty, Patagonia Pile, and Jerry's Quarry.

Visitation and access
The total visitors more than doubled from 2013 to 2019. Awareness of the wildflower bloom in the spring has brought increased visitation.

The paved main road allows visitors to drive to major attractions and through the park. The unpaved roads may require a vehicle with high ground clearance, and four-wheel drive. An example is the Geology Tour Road in the center of the park. Visitors with a four-wheel-drive vehicle can use this road for a self-guided tour with stops that describe the region's geology.

Birdwatching

More than 250 bird species inhabit or visit the park, including resident desert birds such as the greater roadrunner, cactus wren, northern mockingbird, LeConte's thrasher, verdin, and Gambel's quail. About 78 species nest and raise their young within the park. Many migrating species spend only a short time feeding and resting at Joshua Tree, mainly in the winter, as the park lies along an inland stretch of the Pacific Flyway. Other species descend from their usual habitats in the mountains to escape winter snow.

Birdwatching spots include fan palm oases, the Barker Dam, and Smith Water Canyon. Queen Valley and Lost Horse Valley also provide good birdwatching, with a different range of species due to the lack of water, including the ladder-backed woodpecker and oak titmouse. A USGS bird checklist from 2006 contained 239 species in the park.

Astronomy

Joshua Tree is a popular observing site in Southern California for amateur astronomy and stargazing, along with nearby Anza-Borrego Desert State Park.  The park's elevation and dry desert air, along with the relatively stable atmosphere in the region, often make for excellent seeing conditions.

The park is well known for its naturally dark night skies, which are far away from and largely free of the light pollution typical in urban areas.  In 2017, the International Dark-Sky Association designated Joshua Tree a Dark Sky Park.

On clear nights around new moon, the sky darkness of Joshua Tree is rated a class 2–4 on the Bortle scale. This ranges from an "average dark sky" (class 2) in the easternmost region of the park to a sky quality typical of a rural/suburban transition (class 4) in the western regions near Palm Springs. In the easternmost regions of the park, visitors with optimal vision can expect to see the Andromeda (M31) and Triangulum (M33) galaxies with unaided eyes. The central Milky Way appears highly structured to the naked eye from this site, and zodiacal light appears as a faint yellowish glow when visible. In the western regions of the park, the Andromeda Galaxy is still visible, and only the brightest structures around the Galactic Center of the Milky Way can be distinguished; zodiacal light is visible halfway to the zenith.

Wildlife

Birds, lizards, and ground squirrels are most likely to be seen because they are largely active during the day. However, at night desert animals come out to roam. Mostly nocturnal animals include snakes, bighorn sheep, kangaroo rats, coyotes, bobcats, and black-tailed jackrabbits. The desert tortoise is a threatened reptile species that inhabits creosote bush lowlands in the Mojave Desert. The tortoise is well adapted to the arid conditions and rarely drinks water; instead, most of their water is obtained from the plants they consume. Bobcats are a dominant force in the ecosystem. The California tree frog, Pseudacris cadaverina, is found in the rocky, permanent water sources created by the Pinto Fault along the northern edge of the park. The red-spotted toad, Bufo punctatus, is a true denizen of the desert, where it spends most of its life underground. Found from one end of the park to the other, it appears after good, soaking rains. Golden eagles hunt in the park regularly. The roadrunner is an easily recognized resident. The call of Gambel's quail can frequently be heard. The yucca moth Tegeticula synthetica is responsible for pollinating the Joshua trees after which the park is named.

Animals that thrive in Joshua Tree often have special adaptations for dealing with limited water and high summer temperatures. The smaller mammals and all reptiles take refuge from the heat underground. Desert mammals make more efficient use of their bodies’ water supply than the human body. Reptiles are physiologically adapted to getting along with little water, and birds can fly to water sources when they need to drink. Nevertheless, the springs and seeps in the park are necessary for the survival of many animals. Most reptiles and many small rodents and insects go into an inactive state of hibernation during the winter. However, winter is the time of greatest bird concentrations in the park, because of the presence of many migrant species.

Wilderness
The NPS requires registration for overnight camping at specific locations called registration boards. Other requirements include the use of a camp stove (since open campfires are prohibited) and employing Leave No Trace camping techniques (also known as "pack it in, pack it out"). Although bicycles are not allowed in wilderness areas, horses are, but a permit must be obtained in advance for travel in the backcountry. Cellular signals are weak to non-existent and should not be depended on while visiting the park.

Vandalism
On April 1, 2015, graffiti artist André was convicted and fined for vandalizing a boulder in the park. André posted photos of his vandalism on social media. Casey Schreiner, of the hiking blog site Modern Hiker, and some of his readers aided the National Park Service in tracking down and identifying André's vandalism. Before the conviction, André had attempted to silence the reporting with legal threats.

During the 2018–2019 federal government shutdown, reports of vandalism spiked as visitors allegedly chopped down Joshua trees, set illegal fires, drove off-road, and spray-painted rocks. Only eight park rangers were on duty during the government shutdown. Park botanists subsequently determined that one of three Joshua trees reported to have been cut down or damaged during the shutdown had been felled prior to the shutdown.

See also
 Cahuilla
 California Desert Protection Act of 1994
 Chemehuevi
 Eureka Peak
 Johnny Lang
 List of national parks of the United States
 Mojave and Colorado Deserts Biosphere Reserve
 National parks in California
 National Register of Historic Places listings in Joshua Tree National Park

References

Works cited

Further reading
 Birds, Joshua Tree National Park Association
 "Joshua Tree" (2001), California's Gold. VHS videorecording by Huell Howser Productions, in association with KCET/Los Angeles.

External links

  of the National Park Service
 Map of Joshua Tree National Park (archive)
 Geologic Travel Guide: article by the American Geological Institute
 "Keys Ranch: Where Time Stood Still", a National Park Service Teaching with Historic Places (TwHP) lesson plan
 Joshua Tree National Park Bird Checklist with seasonal info.
 
 
 Black Rock Canyon Hiking Trails Map - File:Black Rock Hiking.jpg
 Indian Cove Hiking Trails Map - File:Indian_Cove.jpg

 
National parks in California
Parks in Southern California
Protected areas of the Colorado Desert
Protected areas of the Mojave Desert
Parks in Riverside County, California
Parks in San Bernardino County, California
Archaeological sites in California
Climbing areas of California
Natural history of San Bernardino County, California
Protected areas established in 1994
Protected areas established in 1936
1936 establishments in California